In computational complexity theory, the padding argument is a tool to conditionally prove that if some complexity classes are equal, then some other bigger classes are also equal.

Example 

The proof that  P = NP implies EXP = NEXP uses "padding". 

 by definition, so it suffices to show . 

Let L be a language in NEXP.  Since L is in NEXP, there is a non-deterministic Turing machine M that decides L in time  for some constant c.  Let 

 
 
where '1' is a symbol not occurring in L.  First we show that  is in NP, then we will use the deterministic polynomial time machine given by P = NP to show that L is in EXP.

 can be decided in non-deterministic polynomial time as follows. Given input , verify that it has the form  and reject if it does not.  If it has the correct form, simulate M(x).  The simulation takes non-deterministic  time, which is polynomial in the size of the input, .  So,  is in NP.  By the assumption P = NP, there is also a deterministic machine DM that decides  in polynomial time.  We can then decide L in deterministic exponential time as follows.  Given input , simulate . This takes only exponential time in the size of the input, .  

The  is called the "padding" of the language L. This type of argument is also sometimes used for space complexity classes, alternating classes, and bounded alternating classes.

References